Rene Sheppard is a fictional character in Homicide: Life on the Street, played by Michael Michele.

In Homicide
Sheppard first appeared in Season 7.  She was Miss Anne Arundel County (beauty pageant queen) sometime prior to joining the Baltimore Police Department. She came into the Homicide Section from the Escape and Apprehension Section (Fugitive Squad) and was partnered with Meldrick Lewis. A number of the male detectives are attracted to her, and she is asked out by Meldrick Lewis and Tim Bayliss – she turns them both down in a non-confrontational manner, developing a strong friendship with Bayliss and a strong working relationship (see below) with Lewis.

Her career is tested when an arrest goes bad; Sheppard is severely beaten by the suspect, and her gun is stolen, causing the department to doubt her ability to do her job. Although he at first comes to Sheppard's defense, Lewis also doubts that he can trust her, leading to tension between the two and often resulting in their seeking other partners.  After spending her recovery time behind a desk, Sheppard is allowed to be the primary detective on the "Internet Killer" case, and redeems herself somewhat by leading the investigation that led to the killer, Luke Ryland, being arrested. However, Sheppard later learns that Lewis was not the only cop in the Homicide unit who had concerns about her job performance: Terri Stivers outright says that Sheppard went for her gun too early during the confrontation. In the series' penultimate episode, Sheppard and Laura Ballard work a case involving a murdered female gang member, and Sheppard feels pressured not to call in one of the male detectives to help them. When they close the case, Sheppard says that she can do her job, no matter what anyone thinks.

In the series finale, however, Lewis and Sheppard mend their relationship when Sheppard helps close a particularly frustrating case. Impressed, Lewis asks Sheppard to join him on a homicide call, which they work without any problems.

In Law & Order
Sheppard also appeared in the Law & Order episode "Sideshow" (Part 1).

References

Television characters introduced in 1998
Homicide: Life on the Street characters
Fictional Baltimore Police Department detectives
Fictional African-American people
Fictional beauty queens
Crossover characters in television